Below is a list of recipients of the Royal Victorian Chain:

Edward VII (1902–1910)

George V (1910–1936)

Edward VIII (1936)

George VI (1936–1952)

Elizabeth II (1952–2022)

Charles III (2022–present)

References

Royal Victorian Chain
Queen Victoria
Royal Victorian Chain